Edward Shippen is the name of:

Edward Shippen (1639–1712), second mayor of Philadelphia
Edward Shippen III (1703–1781), 33rd mayor of Philadelphia and Edward Shippen's grandson
Edward Shippen IV (1729–1808), Chief Justice of the Supreme Court of Pennsylvania and son of Edward Shippen III
Edward Shippen Barnes (1887–1958), American organist